Hollywood.Con is a 2021 American adventure comedy film, directed, co-written and starring Mika Boorem (in her feature film directorial debut). Boorem co-wrote the script with her father Benjamin Boorem, who also co-stars and serves as the main producer of the film. In addition to the Boorems, Devin Ratray, Paige Howard, Brian Krause and Tom Arnold also co-star in supporting roles. The film was released on January 15, 2021, through Amazon Prime Video.

Plot
Mika Harms, a struggling actress turned social media influencer, accidentally steals the identity of a film producer and is caught up between two rival film production companies who are competing to film next big Hollywood blockbuster based on Mayan culture. Mika then travels to Central America where she is mistaken for a Mexican cartel member. The trek is also a bonding experience with her father Ben, a gemologist who is searching for a magic jade that the film companies are after.

Cast
Mika Boorem as Mika Harms
Benjamin Boorem as Ben Harms
Devin Ratray as Andy Slimmick
Paige Howard as Veronica Lake
Brian Krause as The Director
Herbert Russell as Josh Lambley
Tom Arnold as El Jade
Nino De Marco as Mayan Priest
Cody Kasch as Marvin Lovejoy
Saxon Trainor as James Worley
Robert Amico as Joseph Worley	
Preston Acuff as Hector "The Lawn Protector"
Chad Roberts as El Jade's son
Brittany Underwood as 	Jocelyn Reynolds
Billy Bob Thornton as himself, with his backing band The Boxmasters

Production
The film's script loosely based Mika Boorem's experiences in the film industry, as well her father Benjamin's work as a gemologist. In addition, the film Romancing the Stone and its sequel The Jewel of the Nile were major inspirations for the film.

References

External links

2021 films
2021 directorial debut films
2021 independent films
2020s adventure comedy films
2020s American films
2020s English-language films
American adventure comedy films
American independent films
Films about con artists
Films about father–daughter relationships
Films about filmmaking
Films directed by Mika Boorem
Films shot in Arizona
Films shot in Guatemala
Films shot in Mexico
Films shot in Texas
Treasure hunt films